Marynka may refer to

 Marynka, Podlaskie Voivodeship, a village in Poland
 Marynka, Greater Poland Voivodeship, a settlement in Poland
 Saint Mary Magdalene High School in Poznań